Baggage is the first studio album from the New York band Sirsy, released in September 2000 and re-released in November 2002.

Track listing
Delicious - 4:22
This Time - 3:53
Soon - 4:43
Dry - 3:47
So Good - 3:44
IOU - 4:14
Soft Like A Girl - 3:43
Let Go - 4:31
Hurricane - 3:10
Wishless - 5:00

2000 albums
Sirsy albums